Esther Eidinow (born 1970) is a British ancient historian and academic. She specialises in ancient Greece, particularly ancient Greek religion and magic. She has been Professor of Ancient History at the University of Bristol since 2017.

Career
Eidinow was awarded a Doctor of Philosophy (DPhil) for a thesis entitled Exploring risk among the ancient Greeks: prolegomena and two case studies. Her doctoral research was completed at the University of Oxford under the supervision of Robert Parker in 2003. A monograph based on the thesis, Oracles, Curses and Risk Among the Ancient Greeks was published in 2007, and praised for its 'analytic rigor' and accessibility.

From 2011 to 2012, Eidinow was a Solmsen Fellow at the Institute for Research in the Humanities of the University of Wisconsin–Madison. Between 2017 and 2018 she was a visiting fellow at the Davis Center for Historical Studies of Princeton University. Since 2017, she has held the Chair in Ancient History at the University of Bristol. She was previously a lecturer at Newman University College and at the University of Nottingham. She was awarded a Philip Leverhulme Prize in 2015, and was described as "an original and powerful new voice in the field of ancient Greek history".

Selected works
  
  
 
  
 
 
 
 
 
 Eidinow, Esther, and Lisa Maurizio, eds. (2020) Narratives of Time and Gender in Antiquity London: Routledge.

References

Living people
Scholars of ancient Greek history
21st-century British historians
British women historians
British classical scholars
Women classical scholars
Scholars of Greek mythology and religion
Classical scholars of the University of Bristol
Academics of the University of Nottingham
University of Wisconsin–Madison fellows
1970 births